James John Corbett (born 6 July 1980) is an English retired footballer. He played in the Football League for Gillingham, Blackburn Rovers, Portsmouth, Darlington and Southend United before dropping into non-League football.

Career
A midfielder, Corbett first became recognised while playing at Gillingham. He was playing in the first team at the age of 17 and his performances attracted attention from Premier League teams, leading to him joining Blackburn Rovers in 1998, for a fee of £525,000, potentially rising to £1m depending on appearances. After joining Blackburn, he was unable to find the form that had attracted so many Premier League teams to him, due to extensive injury problems, including two broken ankles.  Without playing a single game for Blackburn in the league, he was sent out on loan to Portsmouth, and then to Darlington.

After being released by Blackburn at the end of the 2003 season he joined Southend United, where he played a minor part in their team until 2005 when he was released again. He had a trial for Welling United, but a permanent move never materialised. He later joined Folkestone Invicta in 2006 before leaving by mutual consent in December 2008.

He signed for Kent League side Faversham Town ahead of the 2009–10 season. Corbett was forced to retire in December 2011, aged 31, after persistent injury problems.

References

External links

1980 births
Living people
Footballers from the London Borough of Hackney
English footballers
Association football midfielders
Gillingham F.C. players
Blackburn Rovers F.C. players
Portsmouth F.C. players
Darlington F.C. players
Southend United F.C. players
Dagenham & Redbridge F.C. players
Margate F.C. players
Welling United F.C. players
Folkestone Invicta F.C. players
Faversham Town F.C. players
Herne Bay F.C. players
English Football League players